Leptinotarsa rubiginosa, the reddish potato beetle, is a species of leaf beetle in the family Chrysomelidae. It is found in Central America and North America.

References

Further reading

External links

 

Chrysomelinae
Beetles described in 1856